This is a list of protected areas of Sierra Leone, including national parks, game reserves, conservation areas, wetlands, and those that are listed as proposed protected areas in the UN Environment Programme World Conservation Monitoring Centre (UNEP WCM) database.

Forest reserves

Game reserves

Game sanctuaries

National parks

Non-hunting forest reserves

Strict nature reserves

Wetlands of international importance (Ramsar)

Marine Protected Areas (MPAs)

Notes

References 
 World Database on Protected Areas: Sierra Leone, UN Environment Programme World Conservation Monitoring Centre, retrieved on 6 November 2007
 Introduction, Sierra Leone National Commission on the Environment and Forestry, retrieved on 9 November 2007
 "Ramsar Sites Information Service", Ramsar, retrieved on 10 November 2007
 Visit Sierra Leone, retrieved on 6 November 2007
 Sheku Sei and Edward Aruna (2009). Socio-economic studies for the establishment of marine protected areas (MPAs) in the Yawri Bay. Consultancy Report, Pilot project for coastal zone management in Sierra Leone, Funded by Wetlands International and PRCM. Conservation Society Sierra Leone (CSSL)

External links 
 Bird factsheets for some protected areas of Sierra Leone
 Visit Tacugama Chimp Sanctuary in Western Area

 
Sierra Leone
 
National parks
Sierra Leone
Protected areas